McDesme is a rural locality in the Shire of Burdekin, Queensland, Australia. In the  McDesme had a population of 277 people.

Geography 
The locality is bounded to the south by the Burdekin River.

There are three neighbourhoods in the locality:

 Macdesme (different spelling to the locality)
Katoora
 Marali

The North Coast railway line enters the locality from the south (Home Hill across the river via the Burdekin Bridge) and exits to the north (Ayr). There are three now-abandoned railway stations on the line within the locality:

 Macdesme railway station
 Katoora railway station
Marali railway station

History 
All three neighbourhoods take their name from a railway station. The Marali railway station was named on 9 November 1917. Marali is an Aboriginal word meaning tomorrow.

McDesme Provisional School opened on 1905. On 1 January 1909 it became McDesme State School. It closed circa 1964.

The Inkerman Bridge across the Burdekin River to Home Hill officially opened on 8 September 1913. The bridge carried the North Coast railway line. Due to the frequent flooding of the river, the rail and road bridges were often closed or damaged, leading to the decision to build a single higher-level road-and-rail bridge. Due to the lack of rock in the sandy soil to use as foundations, for many years it was not believed possible to build a high-level bridge across the Burdekin River. However, by copying construction techniques used in India for sand-footing bridges, work began on the Burdekin Bridge (also known as the Silver Link) in April 1947 but it was not operational until 27 March 1957. The Burdekin Bridge officially opened on 15 June 1957. At , the Burdekin Bridge is one of the longest multi-span bridges in Australia and the only one in Australia without a firm footing. Some pylons of the Inkerman Bridge are still visible.

In the  McDesme had a population of 277 people.

References 

Shire of Burdekin
Localities in Queensland